Earl Taylor (born 22 July 1932) is a Jamaican sailor. He competed in the Dragon event at the 1964 Summer Olympics.

References

External links
 

1932 births
Living people
Jamaican male sailors (sport)
Olympic sailors of Jamaica
Sailors at the 1964 Summer Olympics – Dragon
Place of birth missing (living people)